Hristo Lemperov (born 22 April 1988) is a Bulgarian footballer who currently plays as a midfielder for Bletchley Scot FC.

References

External links 
 

1988 births
Living people
Bulgarian footballers
Académica Petróleos do Lobito players
Girabola players
FC Pomorie players
Neftochimic Burgas players
FC Dunav Ruse players
First Professional Football League (Bulgaria) players
Association football midfielders